The Footscray Advertiser was a weekly newspaper published from 1874 until 1982 in Footscray, Melbourne, Australia.

While the origins of the Advertiser are not clear, it is thought to have been formed out of the Footscray Observer and Maidstone, Albion, Braybrook and Flemington Advertiser which was published as early as 20 August 1859.

The Advertiser was operated by many different proprietors in its early days but from 1897 until the 1960s it was in the hands of the Jamieson family. In 1966 the Advertiser was owned by Cumberland Newspapers and was known as the Western Suburbs Advertiser from 1966 until 1982 when it ceased publication.

See also
List of newspapers in Australia

References

External links

Digitised World War I Victorian newspapers from the State Library of Victoria

Defunct newspapers published in Victoria (Australia)